Perth Glory Football Club, an association football club based in East Perth, Perth, was founded in 1996. They became the first and only Western Australian member admitted into the A-League Men in 2005, having spent their first eight seasons participating in the National Soccer League. The club's first team has competed in nationally and internationally organised competitions, and all players who have played between 25 and 99 such matches, either as a member of the starting eleven or as a substitute, are listed below.

Each player's details include the duration of his Perth Glory career, his typical playing position while with the club, and the number of games played and goals scored in all senior competitive matches.

Key
 The list is ordered first by date of debut, and then if necessary in alphabetical order.
 Appearances as a substitute are included.
 Statistics are correct up to and including the match played on 2 January 2023. Where a player left the club permanently after this date, his statistics are updated to his date of leaving.

Players

Players highlighted in bold are still actively playing at Perth Glory

See also
 List of Perth Glory FC (A-League Women) players

References

External links
 Perth Glory official website

					

			
 					
Perth Glory
Perth Glory FC players
Association football player non-biographical articles